St. Pauli Theater is a theatre in Hamburg, Germany. It opened in 1841 as the Urania Theater and took its present name in 1941.

References

External links 

 www.st-pauli-theater.de

Theatres in Hamburg
Buildings and structures in Hamburg-Mitte
Theatres completed in 1841
1841 establishments in Germany